Edward Russell Mills (February 23, 1922 – September 27, 2002) was an American professional basketball player. He played in the National Basketball League for the Oshkosh All-Stars and averaged 2.9 points per game.

References

1922 births
2002 deaths
American men's basketball players
Basketball players from Milwaukee
Centers (basketball)
Oshkosh All-Stars players
Wisconsin Badgers men's basketball players